Tricholemma is a genus of North African plants in the grass family.

 Species
 Tricholemma breviaristatum (Barratte) Röser - Algeria
 Tricholemma jahandiezii (Litard. ex Jahand. & Maire) Röser - Algeria, Morocco

See also 
 List of Poaceae genera

References 

Pooideae
Poaceae genera
Flora of North Africa